Astroblepus cyclopus is a species of catfish of the family Astroblepidae. It can be found on Ecuador and Colombia.

References

Bibliography
Eschmeyer, William N., ed. 1998. Catalog of Fishes. Special Publication of the Center for Biodiversity Research and Information, num. 1, vol. 1–3. California Academy of Sciences. San Francisco, California, United States. 2905. .

Astroblepus
Fish described in 1805
Freshwater fish of Colombia
Freshwater fish of Ecuador